Jay Shetty (born 6 September 1987) is an English podcaster, author, and life coach.

Personal life
Shetty, a British-Indian, grew up in Barnet, North London with his parents and younger sister. His mother is a Gujarati (Indian) and father is a Tuluva (Indian). He attended Queen Elizabeth's School, Barnet then went on to graduate from the Cass Business School at the City, University of London. Shetty lives in Los Angeles, California with his wife, Radhi Devlukia Shetty.

Career
In business school, Shetty met Gauranga Das, a monk invited to speak at the school on selflessness and living a minimalist lifestyle. Shetty spoke with Gauranga after his talk and followed him for the remainder of Gauranga's lecture circuit around the United Kingdom. Shetty claims to have spent four summers in India interning at corporations and training with the International Society for Krishna Consciousness, known as the Hare Krishna movement or Hare Krishnas, and three years living a Vedic monk lifestyle at an ashram in Mumbai, India. Shetty began his career at Accenture, working on digital strategy and as a social media coach for the company's executives. His work caught the attention of Arianna Huffington, who hired him to produce videos for Huffington Post about topics such as relationships. Shetty has conducted interviews with a number of public figures.

Shetty was recognized on the National Geographic Chasing Genius Council 2017 and the Asian Media Awards 2016 Best Blog. Shetty was the recipient of awards at the 2016 ITV Asian Media Awards and the 2018 Streamy Awards.

In 2019, Shetty launched the podcast On Purpose. The podcast was downloaded 64 million times in its first year. On Purpose became the number one health podcast in the world according to Forbes.

In April 2019, Shetty was honoured with the Outstanding Achievement Online Award at The Asian Awards and in May 2019 he won Best in Health & Wellness at the 11th Shorty Awards.

In 2019, when Shetty was accused of plagiarizing quotes, 113 posts were removed from his Instagram. Since the accusation, Shetty has been more careful with attribution.

Shetty is the co-founder of a  video production company, Icon Media, along with Alex Kushneir. In 2021, Shetty and his wife Radhi launched Sama Tea, an adaptogenic brand inspired by ayurveda.
In 2022, Shetty joined meditation product company Calm as its "Chief Purpose Officer".

Writing
Simon & Schuster published Shetty's book Think Like a Monk. The book offers advice on reducing stress and improving focus, based on Shetty's experiences from living at an ashram. The book was a bestseller. In 2023, Shetty published “8 Rules of Love: How to Find It, Keep It and Let It Go” which made the New York Times best-seller list.

References

External links

 Jay Shetty on The Today Show
 Jay Shetty's official website for his book Think Like a Monk

1987 births
British Hindus
British Internet celebrities
British people of Gujarati descent
British podcasters
British writers
English Hindus
English people of Gujarati descent
English people of Indian descent
Living people
Shorty Award winners
Tulu people